Karl Wilhelm may refer to: KW or karl
 Karl Wilhelm (botanist) (K.Wilh., 1848–1933), German botanist
 Karl Wilhelm (conductor) (1815–1873), German choral director
 Karl Wilhelm, Duke of Saxe-Meiningen (1754–1782)

See also 
 Carl Wilhelm (1885–1936), German film director, film producer and screenwriter of the silent film era
 Charles William Ferdinand, Duke of Brunswick (1735–1806), Karl Wilhelm Ferdinand in German